Beryl Wayne Sprinkel (November 20, 1923 – August 22, 2009) was an Under Secretary for Monetary Affairs in the US Treasury from January 1981 to April 1985, and member of the Executive Office of the US President and chairman of the Council of Economic Advisers (CEA) between April 4, 1985 and January 21, 1989, during the Reagan administration. Prior to government service, Dr. Sprinkel worked at the Harris Trust and Savings Bank in Chicago from 1952 to 1981, rising to the position of executive vice president. 

Raised on a farm near Richmond, Missouri, Sprinkel was a member of the 2nd Armored Division, which led the attack that penetrated and defeated the German offensive near Celles, Belgium, in the Battle of the Bulge during World War II.  After the war he earned a degree in economics from the University of Missouri and, later, an MBA and PhD from the University of Chicago.  At the University of Chicago he was one of a circle of economists who was heavily influenced by the monetarist ideas of Milton Friedman, who later won the Nobel Prize in Economics.

Death
Sprinkel died on August 22, 2009, aged 85, from Lambert–Eaton myasthenic syndrome in a nursing and rehabilitation center in Chicago. He was survived by his wife, Lory, a son, two stepchildren and five grandchildren.

References

External links
 United States Treasury website
 University of California, Berkeley archives
 

1923 births
2009 deaths
American bankers
United States Army personnel of World War II
Neurological disease deaths in Illinois
People from Richmond, Missouri
University of Chicago Booth School of Business alumni
University of Missouri alumni
Economists from Missouri
20th-century American economists
Chairs of the United States Council of Economic Advisers
Member of the Mont Pelerin Society